Elections to Lambeth London Borough Council were held in May 1990.  The whole council was up for election. Turnout was 42.3%.

Election result

|}

Ward results

References

1990
1990 London Borough council elections
20th century in the London Borough of Lambeth